The First United Methodist Church at 118 N. 7th in Fairview, Oklahoma is a historic church built in 1939.  It was listed on the National Register of Historic Places in 1983.
There is a Fairview First United Methodist Church located at 811 E. Elm Street in Fairview, suggesting that the church congregation has moved.

References

External links
Choir in 2016, at YouTube

Methodist churches in Oklahoma
National Register of Historic Places in Major County, Oklahoma
Gothic Revival architecture in Oklahoma
Churches completed in 1939
1939 establishments in Oklahoma